Ro 44-3888 is a non-peptidic, selective and reversible glycoprotein IIb/IIIa inhibitor. It is the active metabolite of sibrafiban. It was being investigated as a treatment for heart conditions, including myocardial infarctions. The development of Ro 44-3888 and sibrafiban was discontinued in 1999 following unfavorable Phase III efficacy data.

See also 
 Tirofiban

References 

Abandoned drugs
Amidines
Benzamides
Glycoprotein IIb/IIIa inhibitors
Piperidines